Sarawut Koedsri (born 29 April 1989) is a Thai professional footballer who plays as a centre-back for Chiangmai in Thai League 2.

Playing career

Club
Koedsri played for Khon Kaen before transferring to BG Pathum United for the 2021–22 Thai League 1 season.

Career statistics

References

External links 
 

Sarawut Koedsri
Living people
1989 births
Sarawut Koedsri
Sarawut Koedsri
Sarawut Koedsri
Sarawut Koedsri
Association football defenders
Sarawut Koedsri
Sarawut Koedsri